Alte Luppe is a small river of Saxony, Germany.

The Alte Luppe flows in the northwestern suburbs of Leipzig. It begins as a left branch of the Bauerngraben River. It is a left tributary of the Neue Luppe river.

See also
List of rivers of Saxony

References

Rivers of Saxony
Rivers of Germany